The Nanping school massacre/stabbings occurred at Nanping City Experimental Elementary School in the city of Nanping, Fujian Province, People's Republic of China, in which a man used a knife to kill eight children and seriously wound five others. The incident occurred on 23 March 2010, around 7:20 am local time. It was the first of the 2010 Chinese school attacks. The perpetrator later confessed to the crime, telling police investigators "life was meaningless" .

Incident and casualties
The children were attacked outside the gates by a man as they were arriving for school at 7:20 am local time (UTC+8).  (Before the attacks, it was the school's practice to keep the gates shut until school began at 7:30 am) The perpetrator was subdued on the scene by three adults. Of the eight fatalities, six died at the scene and the other two later in hospital.  The deceased were four boys and four girls.

The school, which has around 2,000 students, closed for the day on March 23 before reopening the following day.

Perpetrator

Zheng Minsheng (30 April 1968 – 28 April 2010) who had previously worked as a community doctor, was arrested. The Associated Press reported that, according to a Nanping city government official who refused to be named, Zheng had a history of mental health issues. Zheng later told police investigating the crime that he thought "life was meaningless", and confessed to the crime. He was charged with intentional homicide by the province's procuratorate.

At the trial, police stated that Zheng had no history of mental illness, contradicting earlier reports.  Zheng said that he performed the attack after being turned down by a girl and suffering "unfair treatment" from the girl's wealthy family.  He was found guilty and sentenced to death on 8 April 2010. Zheng was executed by shooting twenty days later.

Victims
Names of those killed during the massacre in English and Chinese, along with ages.
Ke Cuiting - 柯翠婷 (5)
Chen Chuning - 陈楚柠 (5)
Ouyang Yuhao - 欧阳宇豪 (4)
Huang Shujie - 黄舒婕 (4)
Peng Fei - 彭飞 (7)
Chen Jiahui - 陈佳慧 (2)
Zhou Yuxiao - 周雨笑 (4)
Hou Chuanjie - 侯传杰 (7)

See also
 2010 Chinese school attacks
School attacks in China
List of countries by intentional homicide rate

References

Massacres in China
School massacres
Mass murder in 2010
Fujian
Mass stabbings in China
Nanping
March 2010 crimes
March 2010 events in China
School killings in China
Knife attacks
2010 murders in China
21st-century mass murder in China
Attacks on schools in China